Hariharpur is a census town and a gram panchayat within the jurisdiction of the  Baruipur police station in the Baruipur CD block in the Baruipur subdivision of the South 24 Parganas district in the Indian state of West Bengal.

Geography

Area overview
Baruipur subdivision is a rural subdivision with moderate levels of urbanization. 31.05% of the population lives in the urban areas and 68.95% lives in the rural areas. In the southern portion of the subdivision  (shown in the map alongside) there are 20 census towns. The entire district is situated in the Ganges Delta and the southern part is covered by the Baruipur-Jaynagar Plain. Archaeological excavations at Dhosa and Tilpi, on the bank of the Piyali River indicate the existence of human habitation around 2,000 years ago.

Note: The map alongside presents some of the notable locations in the subdivision. All places marked in the map are linked in the larger full screen map.

Location

Petua, Panchghara, Mallikpur and Hariharpur form a cluster of census towns in the Baruipur CD block, as per the map of Baruipur CD block in the District Census Handbook for the South 24 Parganas. This cluster has Rajpur Sonarpur on the east and Bidyadharpur on the north, both in the Sonarpur CD block, as per the map of the Sonarpur CD block in the District Census Handbook for the South 24 Parganas.

Demographics
According to the 2011 Census of India, Hariharpur had a total population of 12,027, of which 6,038 (50%) were males and 5,989 (50%) were females. There were 1,346 persons in the age range of 0 to 6 years. The total number of literate persons was 8,333 (78.02% of the population over 6 years).

Infrastructure
According to the District Census Handbook 2011, Hariharpur covered an area of 1.7476 km2. Among the physical aspects, there is a railway station at Mallikpur 2.1 km away. Among the civic amenities, it had 8 km roads with open drains, the protected water supply involved  hand pumps. It had 2,800 domestic electric connections. Among the medical facilities it had 1 dispensary/ health centre and 10 medicine shops. Among the educational facilities it had were 4 primary schools, the nearest secondary school, senior secondary school were at Baikunthapur 2 km away. Among the social, recreational and cultural facilities, it had 1 orphanage and 1 old age home. Among the important commodities it produced were garments and pickles. It had the branch office of 1 nationalised bank.

Transport
A short stretch of local roads link Hariharpur to the State Highway 1.

Mallikpur railway station is located nearby.

Healthcare
Hariharpur Block Primary Health Centre, with 10 beds, at Hariharpur (PO Mallikpur), is the major government medical facility in the Baruipur CD block.

References

Cities and towns in South 24 Parganas district
Kolkata Metropolitan Area